Rebecca Jane Hazlewood is a British actress. She was born in Wales and grew up in the village of  Kingswinford in the Black Country, West Midlands. She is of Anglo-Indian descent.

Career 
Hazlewood was discovered by Caryn Franklin, who selected her to model on the BBC’s The Clothes Show while Hazlewood was skipping school.

On British television, Hazlewood played  Arun Parmar in the psychodrama Bad Girls. In the United States, she played Asha in the NBC sitcom Outsourced, which aired for one season. 

Other early work included acting as Talia Ahmed in the ITV series Second Sight alongside Clive Owen, in the Masters of the Universe a special BBC week-long series in January 2010 as college lecturer Sia and the 2001 British Film4 feature Dog Eat Dog with David Oyelowo, Gary Kemp and Ricky Gervais. In 2006 she featured as Beth in Meeting Helen’’. She appeared in a lead role in the indie feature film Kissing Cousins.

In 2007, Hazlewood played young Parin in The Ode, based on the novel Ode to Lata by acclaimed novelist Ghalib Shiraz Dhalla. In 2008, Hazlewood appeared throughout Season 14 of the NBC drama ER, portraying Jaspreet, a wayward cousin of Neela's, who came straight from London in order to avoid an arranged marriage. In 2009, Hazlewood appeared as Nalini, an Ajira Airways ticket agent, in season 5 of Lost. In 2011, Hazlewood appeared as Meera in Embrace, written, directed and produced by Ghalib Shiraz Dhalla. In 2012, Hazlewood guest starred on Grey's Anatomy, episode 17, "One Step Too Far". In 2013, Hazlewood guest-starred on the White Collar season 5 episode "Digging Deeper". She appeared in the film Equals directed by Drake Doremus and produced by Ridley Scott. 

She guest-starred in multiple episodes of The Good Place as Kamilah.

Rebecca has a cameo role in experimental feature Lost In London,'' written and directed by Woody Harrelson, which was filmed in one take and screened live in cinemas across the world.

Filmography

References

External links 
 
Rebecca Hazlewood at instagram
Rebecca Hazlewood`s Youtube channel
Teacher in a Box at Youtube

Year of birth missing (living people)
Living people
British people of Anglo-Indian descent
British actresses of Indian descent
English people of Indian descent
English television actresses
21st-century English actresses
People from Kingswinford
English film actresses